Ned Luke (born October 4, 1958) is an American actor. He is known for playing Michael De Santa in the 2013 video game Grand Theft Auto V. Luke also voiced Raffles in the animated movie Rover Dangerfield. He has appeared in 29 movies and television shows as well as over 100 commercials.

Early life
Ned Luke was born on October 4, 1958 in Danville, Illinois, to Cindy (née Smith) and Fred Luke. His maternal grandfather was actor Paul Birch. 

He graduated from Danville High School in 1977 where he was a bi-sport athlete and honor student. He later attended the University of Illinois in Champaign, Illinois. He has four siblings.

Career
Luke's first major voice role was in Rover Dangerfield, where he played a sheepdog named Raffles opposite Rodney Dangerfield. He was cast as a guest star in several TV shows throughout the 1990s and early 2000s, and has appeared in about 100 television commercials featuring products such as Budweiser and Burger King.

In 2007, having grown disenchanted with show business and desiring that his son experience where he grew up, Luke decided to take a break from acting and moved his family from Los Angeles to his hometown of Danville, where he opened a restaurant with his brother. After two years, he decided to return to acting and he and his family moved to New York City. His agent suggested he audition for the role of Michael De Santa, one of the three protagonists of Rockstar Games' Grand Theft Auto V. Luke initially scoffed at the idea of being in a video game, but after reading the script he decided to proceed with the audition. Luke was eventually cast as one of the game's three playable protagonists, Michael De Santa. Grand Theft Auto V went on to set several sales records and has become the 2nd highest grossing video game in history.

Filmography

Film

Television

Video games

Accolades

References

External links

1958 births
Living people
American male video game actors
American male film actors
American male television actors
American male voice actors
Male motion capture actors
People from Danville, Illinois
20th-century American male actors
21st-century American male actors
Male actors from Illinois
People from Westchester County, New York
University of Illinois Urbana-Champaign alumni